Victor Dennis Kearney (10 December 1903 – 21 January 1982) was an Australian politician. Born in Armidale, New South Wales, he was educated there at De la Salle College. He became an organiser of the Australian Workers' Union and then secretary of the Canberra Trades and Labour Council. In 1956, he was elected unopposed to the Australian House of Representatives seat of Cunningham, representing the Labor Party, in the by-election caused by the death of Billy Davies. Kearney's election was the last time a member with full voting rights was returned unopposed to the House. Kearney held the seat until he retired in 1963, although he unsuccessfully tried to regain Cunningham as an independent in 1966. Later, having moved to Queensland, he became a member of the Democratic Labor Party, contesting the seat of McPherson for the DLP in 1972. He died in 1982.

References

Australian Labor Party members of the Parliament of Australia
Democratic Labor Party (historical) politicians
Members of the Australian House of Representatives for Cunningham
Members of the Australian House of Representatives
1903 births
1982 deaths
20th-century Australian politicians